British Prisoner of War Camps in East Africa during World War II

Part of Lists of Prisoner-of-War Camps section in the Prisoner-of-war camp article.

The following list is an attempt to create the most complete list of 
British POW Camps in East Africa during World War II.

Table was retrieved from http://www.christies.com/lotfinder/LotDetailsPrintable.aspx?intObjectID=407848 and from a map from II WW UK archives 

Italian POW camps  were mentioned in literature, i.e. Gilgil, Naivasha, Nyeri and Londiani., Ndarugu
There was also an Italian POW camp at Mackinnon Road (60 miles from Mombasa). In 1950 it still had at least three 'prisoners' there who refused to leave! Roy Ashworth

Camp No. 360 at Ndarugu, that held some 10,000 prisoners, has miraculously escaped sub-division and new constructions. It was “discovered” by Mr. Aldo Manos in 2007, with the church and the monument built by the prisoners almost intact. In 2011 they were gazetted by the Government as “monuments of the history of Kenya”.

References

See also
Reference to Camp 354 in No Picnic on Mount Kenya

Lists of World War II prisoner of war camps
Prisoner of war camps in Kenya
POW camps
World War II sites in Kenya